Mergen is a surname and given name. Notable people with the name include:

Surname
Anne Briardy Mergen (1906-1994), American editorial cartoonist
Sophie Mergen, French radio and television journalist

Given name
Mergen Mämmedow (born 1990), Turkmenistan athlete

See also
Mergen, Turkish deity
Mergens, surname